The 2013 Molson Coors Tankard, the Nova Scotia men's provincial curling championship, was held from February 6 to 10 at the Truro Curling Club in Truro, Nova Scotia. The winning team of Paul Flemming represented Nova Scotia at the 2013 Tim Hortons Brier in Edmonton, Alberta.

Teams

Round-robin standings

Round-robin results

Draw 1
Wednesday, February 6, 1:00 pm

Draw 2
Wednesday, February 6, 6:00 pm

Draw 3
Thursday, February 7, 9:00 am

Draw 4
Thursday, February 7, 2:00 pm

Draw 5
Thursday, February 7, 7:00 pm

Draw 6
Friday, February 8, 2:00 pm

Draw 7
Friday, February 8, 7:00 pm

Tiebreaker
Saturday, February 9, 9:00 am

Playoffs

1 vs. 2
Saturday, February 9, 2:00 pm

3 vs. 4
Saturday, February 9, 2:00 pm

Semifinal
Saturday, February 9, 7:00 pm

Final
Sunday, February 10, 2:00 pm

Qualification rounds

Round 1
The first qualification round for the 2013 Nova Scotties Men's Provincial Championship took place from January 10 to 13 at the Amherst Curling Club in Amherst. The event was held in an open-entry triple knockout format qualifying five teams to the provincial playoffs.

Teams

Results

A Event

B Event

C Event

Round 2
The second qualification round for the 2013 Nova Scotties Men's Provincial Championship will take place from January 17 to 20 at the Wolfville Curling Club in Wolfville. The event will be held in an open-entry triple knockout format qualifying three teams to the provincial playoffs.

Teams

Results

A Event

B Event

C Event

References

External links
Results Website

Nova Scotia
Truro, Nova Scotia
Curling in Nova Scotia